Pridorozhnoye is a rural locality (a selo) in Chergalinsky Selsoviet of Romnensky District, Amur Oblast, Russia. The population was 42 as of 2018. There is 1 street.

Geography 
Pridorozhnoye is located on the right bank of the Gorbyl River, 24 km northeast of Romny (the district's administrative centre) by road. Smolyanoye is the nearest rural locality.

References 

Rural localities in Romnensky District